Ban Chenchen (born 6 June 1991) is a Chinese handball player for Anhui and the Chinese national team.

She participated at the 2017 World Women's Handball Championship.

References

1991 births
Living people
Chinese female handball players